Bolivia competed at the 2020 Summer Olympics in Tokyo. Originally scheduled to take place from 24 July to 9 August 2020, the Games were postponed to 23 July to 8 August 2021, due to the COVID-19 pandemic. It was the nation's fifteenth appearance at the Summer Olympics, since its debut in 1936.

Competitors
The following is the list of number of competitors in the Games.

Athletics

Bolivia received the universality slots from IAAF to send two athletes (one men and one women) to the Olympics.

Track & road events

Swimming

Bolivia received a universality invitation from FINA to send two top-ranked swimmers (one per gender) in their respective individual events to the Olympics, based on the FINA Points System of June 28, 2021.

Tennis

Bolivia entered one tennis player into the Olympic tournament for the first time since Sydney 2000. Following the late withdrawals of several tennis players, Hugo Dellien (world no. 129) accepted a spare berth previously allocated to one of the original top 56 entrants to compete in the men's singles based on the ATP Entry Rankings of June 14, 2021, signifying the country's return to the sport for the first time since 2000.

See also
Bolivia at the 2019 Pan American Games

References

Olympics
Nations at the 2020 Summer Olympics
2020